Rhamdiopsis is a genus of three-barbeled catfishes native to South America where they are endemic to Brazil.  One species, R. krugi, is troglobitic.

Species
There are currently three recognized species in this genus:
 Rhamdiopsis krugi Bockmann & R. M. C. Castro, 2010
 Rhamdiopsis microcephala (Lütken, 1874)
 Rhamdiopsis moreirai Haseman, 1911

References

Heptapteridae
Fish of South America
Fish of Brazil
Endemic fauna of Brazil
Catfish genera
Freshwater fish genera